Cholmley House or Whitby Hall is a banqueting house sited next to the ruins of Whitby Abbey in North Yorkshire, England. It was built in 1672 by Sir Hugh Cholmeley, whose family had acquired the Abbey ruins and the land around them after its dissolution in 1539 - from then until 1672, the family had lived in what had been the Abbey's gatehouse and guest lodgings. It was originally built with a square forecourt in front of it, now known as the Stone Garden - this contains a replica of the Borghese Gladiator, another replica of which was owned by the builder of the house.

In 1743 the family succeeded to the Wentworth estates and moved its main base to Howsham Hall, leaving Cholmley House deserted. The north front lost its roof in a storm in 1790, leading to the demolition of the north front. Only the main hall remained and even this fell into decay before coming into the possession of the Strickland family, who fitted bracing arches in 1866 to secure its walls. These arches were replaced after the Ministry of Works took over the house and abbey ruins in 1936, before it was transferred to the Ministry's successor English Heritage in 1984. The house was reopened on 30 March 2002 by David Hope, then Archbishop of York, as the museum, shop and visitor reception for the Abbey site.

Sources

George Young, A picture of Whitby and its environs, 1824
http://www.timetravel-britain.com/articles/towns/whitby.shtml

External links

Country houses in North Yorkshire
Houses completed in 1672
Whitby
History museums in North Yorkshire
Archaeological museums in North Yorkshire
English Heritage sites in North Yorkshire
Ruins in North Yorkshire
Archaeological museums in England
Religious museums in England
1672 establishments in England